Hans Sennewald (born 12 September 1961) is a retired German rower who won a bronze medal in the eights event at the 1992 Summer Olympics. He also won six medals in various events at the world championships of 1982–1993.

His daughter Ulrike also became an Olympic rower.

References

1961 births
Living people
Olympic rowers of Germany
Rowers at the 1992 Summer Olympics
Olympic bronze medalists for Germany
Olympic medalists in rowing
German male rowers
World Rowing Championships medalists for East Germany
Medalists at the 1992 Summer Olympics
World Rowing Championships medalists for Germany
People from Märkisch-Oderland
People of the Stasi
Sportspeople from Brandenburg